This is a list of extinct plants of the Nordics (including Sweden, Norway, Denmark, Finland, and Iceland). The list consists of common name, Latin name, known geographical range, and approximate extinction date, with the ”†” symbol indicating that the species is considered extinct worldwide.

Algae
Bauer Stonewort, Chara baueri (Sweden - 2000)
†Hedströmia halimedoidea (Gotland, Sweden - Silurian)
Pearl Stonewort, Nitella tenuissima (Sweden - 2005)
†Solenopora compacta (Gotland, Sweden - Silurian)
†Solenopora gotlandica (Gotland, Sweden - Silurian)
Southern Pearl-Band Algae, Kumanoa virgatodecaisneana (Sweden - 2005)
†Sphaerocodium gotlandicum (Gotland, Sweden - Silurian)
†Spongiostroma holimi (Gotland, Sweden - Silurian)

Angiosperms
†Acer crenatifolium islandicum (Iceland - Tertiary)
†Alnus gaudinii (Iceland - Tertiary)
†Betula islandica (Iceland - Tertiary)
†Bertilanthus scanicus (Skåne, Sweden - Cretaceous)
Burnet Rose, Rosa spinosissima (Sweden - 2005)
†Comptonia (Iceland - Tertiary)
Darnel, Lolium temulentum (Sweden - 2000)
†Fagus friedrichii (Iceland - Tertiary)
Flax Dodder, Cuscuta epilinum (Sweden - 2000)
Flax Grass, Lolium remotum (Sweden - 2000)
Giant Corn Spurry, Spergula arvensis maxima (Sweden - 2000)
Hoary Mugwort, Artemisia stelleriana (Sweden - 2000)
Karakas Bramble, Rubus dasyphyllus (Sweden / Denmark - 2000; only extinct in Sweden)
Lopsided Oat, Avena strigosa (Sweden - 2000)
†Magnolia kobe (Iceland - Tertiary)
Oil Mustard, Camelina sativa (Sweden - 2000)
Pendulous Sedge, Carex pendula (Sweden - 2000)
†Populus (Iceland - Tertiary)
Primrose, Primula vulgaris (Sweden - 2000)
†Pterocarya (Iceland - Tertiary)
Red Nightshade, Solanum villosum miniatum (Sweden - 2000)
†Scandianthus costatus (Skåne, Sweden - Cretaceous)
†Silvianthemum suecicum (Skåne, Sweden - Cretaceous)
Small Fleabane, Pulicaria vulgaris (Sweden - 2000)
Tumbling Saltbush, Atriplex rosea (Sweden - 2010)
Village Amaranth, Oxybasis urbica (Sweden - 2000)
Winding Mustard, Camelina alyssum (Sweden - 2000)

Bennettites
†Pterophyllum majus (Höör, Skåne, Sweden - Jurassic)

Ferns
†Cladophlebis (Skromberga, Skåne, Sweden - Triassic)
†Dictyophyllum exile (Skåne, Sweden - Jurassic)
†Dictyophyllum nilssoni (Skåne, Sweden - Jurassic)
†Dictyophyllum spectabile (Höör, Skåne, Sweden - Jurassic)
†Thaumatopteris schenkii (Skåne, Sweden - Jurassic)

Fungi
Britannic Lichen, Peltigera britannica (Sweden - 2000)
Gray Ring Lichen, Evernia illyrica (Sweden - 2000)
Large Porina, Porina grandis (Sweden - 2010)
Little Pillow Lichen, Lichinodium ahlneri (Sweden - 2010)
Mo-Rag Lichen, Scytinium tetrasporum (Sweden - 2010)
Powder Plug, Chlorophyllum agaricoides (Sweden - 2000)
Roll Skin, Auriculariopsis albomellea (Sweden - 2000)
Shaft Lichen, Szczawinskia leucopoda (Sweden - 2010)
Spotted Wood Dune Lichen, Micarea melaeniza (Sweden - 2010)
Tooth Polypore, Spongipellis pachyodon (Sweden - 2000)
†Tortotubus (Gotland, Sweden - Ordovician)

Gymnosperms

Conifers
†Elatides sternbergii (Bjuv, Skåne, Sweden - Triassic)
†Metasequoia occidentalis (Spetsbergen, Svalbard, Norway - Tertiary)
†Podozamites lanceolatus (Stabbarp, Skåne, Sweden - Triassic)
†Sciadopytis (Sweden / Norway / Denmark / Finland / Iceland - Tertiary)
†Stenorrhachis scanicus (Höör, Skåne, Sweden - Jurassic)

Cycads
†Ctenis nilssonii (Bjuv, Skåne, Sweden - Triassic)
†Nilssonia brevis (Höör, Skåne, Sweden - Triassic)
†Nilssonia polymorpha (Hörsandstenen in Helsingborg and Sofiero in Skåne, Sweden - Triassic)
†Nilssonia pterophylloides (Bjuv, Skåne, Sweden - Triassic)

Ginkgos
†Baiera gracilis (Eriksdal in Skåne, Sweden - Jurassic)
†Ginkgo (Fyledalen in Skåne, Sweden / Spetsbergen in Svalbard, Norway - Jurassic)
†Ginkgoites regnelii (Eriksdal in Skåne, Sweden - Jurassic)

Lycopods
†Jurinodendron kiltorkense (Cape Olsen, Björnön, Svalbard, Norway - Devonian)

Mosses
Heath Trunk Moss, Pallavicinia lyellii (Sweden - 2000)
†Ricciopsis florinii (Skromberga, Skåne, Sweden - Triassic)

Progymnosperms
†Archaeopteris halliana (Cape Olsen, Björnön, Svalbard, Norway - Devonian)
†Cephalopteris major (Cape Levin, Björnön, Svalbard, Norway - Devonian)

References

Flora of Northern Europe
Nordics
Nordics